Step test can refer to:

 STEP Eiken: Japan's national English exam, the Eiken Test in Practical English Proficiency,  produced by the Society for Testing English Proficiency (STEP), Inc.
 Sixth Term Examination Paper, an examination set by the University of Cambridge to assess potential undergraduate mathematics applicants.
 The step test was a cardiac fitness test formerly administered by the U.S. Forest Service as a physical fitness test for wildland firefighters.  It has been replaced by the Work Capacity Test (WCT), also known as the pack test.
 Harvard step test, a type of cardiac stress test for detecting and/or diagnosing cardiovascular disease and measure fitness.